Stracimir is an archaic masculine Serbian name. Notable people with the name include:

Stracimir Zavidović, 12th-century Serbian noble that ruled Duklja
Stracimir Balšić, 14th-century Serbian noble that ruled Zeta

Slavic masculine given names
Serbian masculine given names